Victoria Jackson may refer to:

 Victoria Jackson (born 1959), actress
 Victoria Jackson (entrepreneur) (born 1955), cosmetics entrepreneur

See also
 Victoria Jackson-Stanley (born 1953), politician